Do Ustad is a 1982 Bollywood action-film directed and produced by S. D. Narang. The film stars Shatrughan Sinha, Reena Roy, Danny Denzongpa in lead roles. The music of the film was composed by Bappi Lahiri.

Cast 
Shatrughan Sinha as Shiva
Reena Roy as Roopa
Danny Denzongpa as Daku Badal Singh
Jeevan as Dharamdas
Vikram as Aslam
Nirupa Roy as Aslam's Mother
Shakti Kapoor as Shaka

Soundtrack
Lyrics: Verma Malik

References

External links
 

1982 films
1980s Hindi-language films
Films scored by Bappi Lahiri